1958 – Paris Olympia is a live album by drummer Art Blakey's Jazz Messengers recorded at L'Olympia in 1958 and originally released on the French Fontana label.

Reception

Scott Yanow of Allmusic called it "Hard bop at its best, all of it propelled by the powerful drumming of Art Blakey".

Track listing 
All compositions by Benny Golson except where indicated.
 "Just by Myself" – 4:35   
 "I Remember Clifford" – 5:36   
 "Are You Real" – 10:17   
 "Moanin'" (Bobby Timmons) – 13:38   
 "Justice" (Thelonious Monk) – 9:17   
 "Blues March" – 5:46   
 "Whisper Not" – 7:11

Personnel 
Art Blakey – drums
Lee Morgan – trumpet
Benny Golson – tenor saxophone
Bobby Timmons – piano
Jymie Merritt  – bass

References 

Art Blakey live albums
The Jazz Messengers live albums
1958 live albums
Albums recorded at the Olympia (Paris)
Fontana Records live albums